Oricilla was a genus of Early Devonian land plant with branching axes. Fossils have been found from the Pragian to the Emsian.

A cladogram published in 2004 by Crane et al. places Oricilla in the core of a paraphyletic stem group of broadly defined "zosterophylls", basal to the lycopsids (living and extinct clubmosses and relatives). 

Hao and Xue in 2013 used the absence of terminal sporangia to place the genus in the paraphyletic order Gosslingiales, a group of zosterophylls considered to have indeterminate growth, with fertile branches generally showing circinate vernation (initially curled up). Kenrick and Crane in 1997 also placed the genus in the family Gosslingiaceae, but they place this family in the order Sawdoniales.

References

Bibliography

External links
 Cladogram from 

Zosterophylls
Prehistoric lycophyte genera
Devonian plants
Emsian life
Pragian life
Paleozoic life of New Brunswick